PRhyme 2 is the second studio album by American hip hop duo PRhyme, consisting of Royce da 5'9" and DJ Premier. Produced entirely by DJ Premier, the album features samples composed by producer AntMan Wonder. It was released on March 16, 2018 via their own record label PRhyme Records and INgrooves Music Group, and is a sequel to the eponymous album PRhyme. The album features guest appearances from rappers 2 Chainz, Big K.R.I.T., Dave East, Rapsody, Roc Marciano, Yelawolf, Chavis Chandler, bassist Brady Watt and singers Novel (as a part of duo Summer of '96 with Wonder), CeeLo Green and Denaun Porter.

Background
As early as September 2015, Royce mentioned rappers Eminem, Kendrick Lamar, and The Game on Twitter as possible featured artists on PRhyme 2. On February 18, 2016 in an interview with Vibe, Royce stated that in April of the same year that him and DJ Premier were going to begin recording songs for the album: "I can tell you that me and Preem are going in April to do PRhyme 2." A year later on March 16, 2017 in an interview with Billboard, Premier stated that PRhyme 2 was nearing completion but still needed to have features and mixing on the songs: "PRhyme 2 is almost done. I’m one song away from finishing but we still have to mix and we have features. We still got to get all the features locked down." Two months later on May 18, it was revealed that Royce and Premier were in the studio working on the album. Six months later on November 3, both Royce and Premier officially announced that PRhyme 2 was completed and that they were planning a release date. On February 25, 2018, the tracklist and cover art were released.

Critical reception

PRhyme 2 received mostly favorable reviews. At Metacritic, which assigns a normalized rating out of 100 to reviews from mainstream publications, the album received an average score of 74, based on 6 reviews, indicating "generally favorable reviews." Neil Z. Young at AllMusic commented that "combined with hard-hitting beats, old-school scratching, and a dizzying maze of dense rhymes, PRhyme 2 satisfies more than its predecessor and should please fans of Smoke DZA and Pete Rock's collaborative Don't Smoke Rock, Run the Jewels' more laid-back material, and the Dilated Peoples catalog." Scott Glaysher of XXL compared it to their previous album and noted the varying content that Royce frequently switched from: "Despite PRhyme 2 being twice as long as its nine-track predecessor, Premier never defaults to redundant sounds. “1 of the Hardest” loops a head-banging guitar riff, “Era” uses twinkly synths that rapidly alternate between left and right speaker channels, “Flirt” sports a classic New York bassline and chorus that nods to Camp Lo's "Luchini"—and that’s just to name a few of the album's different flavors. Musically and lyrically, PRhyme 2 holds its own next to its precursor."

Kyle Mullin of Exclaim! praised PRhyme 2 for DJ Premier's production and Royce's subject matter on the album but criticized it for not being as sufficient of an effort as there was on the previous effort, calling CeeLo Green's hook on the track "Gotta Love It" "cloying" and "Flirt" being "laughably clunky" and "brutally sexist". Karas Lamb at Consequence of Sound appreciated the "building bridges between hip-hop’s veterans and rising icons, who will predict the size and shape of the next wave", but felt that Royce's "appetite for glory also makes room for ego and showmanship to muddy the final mix". Lamb questioned the choice behind Premier's "decision to lean on other producers for the sound" for the previous album and PRhyme 2, calling it "curious and unnecessary". Jonah Bromwich of Pitchfork was also interested in the choice, stating that it was an "unusual constraint" and said that "sometimes, the veteran Detroit rapper [Royce] transcends his natural Buddenism, avoiding corny punchlines, esoteric lyrical easter eggs, and bars that lead him nowhere. At other times, he doesn’t."

Track listing
All tracks are produced by DJ Premier.
All tracks written by Ryan Montgomery, Christopher Martin, and Anthony Reid, except where noted.

Personnel
Credits adapted from AllMusic.

PRhyme

 Ryan Montgomery - composition, A&R, executive producer
 Christopher Martin - producer (all tracks), composition, executive producer, mixing, scratching, vocal engineer

Additional personnel

 Anthony Reid - composition, sample source
 Brady Watt - composition, bass guitar
 Parks Valley - mixing, vocal engineer
 Jason "Asar" Qualls - vocal engineer
 I.V. Duncan - vocal engineer
 Ryan Hyland - vocal engineer
 Brian "B-Jones" Jones - vocal engineer
 Tony Dawsey - mastering
 Amanda Demme - creative director, photography
 Christopher Ardell - layout

Charts

References

Notes

2018 albums
DJ Premier albums
Royce da 5'9" albums
Sequel albums
Collaborative albums
Albums produced by DJ Premier